Sandholm may refer to:

 Sandholm, an estate in Allerød Municipality
 Sandholm Camp, a military installation in Allerød Municipality
 Center Sandholm, a public institution for asylum seekers in the former Sandholm Camp